The Mr. Kansas Basketball honor recognizes the best high school basketball player in the state of Kansas as voted on by the Kansas Basketball Coaches Association.  The players listed below also will have which college they attended, as well as if they were drafted into the NBA draft. Five different schools have had multiple winners, McPherson has the most. Hayden in Topeka, Leavenworth, Topeka West, and Wichita South have also had multiple winners. Kansas has had the most Mr. Kansas basketball commits with seven. Only six winners of the award have been drafted into the NBA.

Award winners

Multiple winners by school

By high school

By College

See also
Miss Kansas Basketball

References

Kansas
High school sports in Kansas
Awards established in 1983
Lists of people from Kansas
Kansas sports-related lists